Sarah Haoda Todd is an entrepreneur, fashion designer and activist from Lae, Papua New Guinea. After starting a cleaning business in 1997, Haoda Todd became a fashion designer, basing her designs on the art, culture, materials, and symbols of Morobe Province and Papua New Guinea. She is also one of the founders of Arise Women, an organization that fights against violence affecting women and children.

Education 
In 2012, Haoda Todd completed a two-year Diploma in Management from Divine Word University, PNG. She then completed the Executive MBA program at Papua New Guinea University of Technology.

Career

Lae Everclean 
After working as an executive assistant for a mining company and as an advertising executive for a plastics and chemical manufacturer, Haoda Todd went out on her own. When Haoda Todd started her cleaning service, Lae Everclean Limited in 1997, she had just three employees. Originally based in Lae City, her goal was to become a laundry and dry cleaning service, but she had trouble getting the business up and running. She was turned down for small business loans three times.

Haoda Todd credits an Australian retiree, Ron Werner, for mentoring her through the early years. When she could not make it by focusing on laundry, he suggested that she "clean toilets and buildings." Lae Everclean grew into a cleaning and laundry service with large corporate clients, such as SP Brewery Lae and Nambawan Super Ltd in Port Moresby. In 2008, she expanded to Port Moresby, and by 2013, the business employed over 350 employees.

Speaking 
After receiving the Westpac Women in Business Award in 2011, Haoda-Todd began speaking internationally, including in a US State Department professional exchange, the 2012 The International Visitor Leadership Program (IVLP) in Washington, DC, and at the Pacific Islands Private Sector Organization's (PIPSO) Women in Business Conference in Nadi, Fiji.

PNGianKala 
In 2012, Haoda Todd founded PNGianKala (pronounced "Papua New Guinean color"), a clothing company, with the motto: "Wear your culture." She draws on cultures and the beauty of PNG to inspire her designs and to protect and preserve diverse and unique art and culture, inspired by such local materials as bilum, tattoo, and Oro tapa. She premiered the line at an Indigenous Business Council fundraiser. PNGianKala includes labels such as her Kekeni line, and Sha-mata Clothing, making American consumer products in clothing and accessories. 

As PNG did not have the capacity to do digital printing on high quality silk, Haoda Todd commissioned a company overseas to do the printing. Unfortunately, when the agent saw she was from "New Guinea," her cloth was all shipped to Africa, which meant she had nothing to show. She managed to get her designs printed on to Spandex—the closest fabric available—and had twelve outfits to reveal at the show. 

Along with shows in Fiji, Indonesia, and Australia PNG Fashion and Design Week highlighted Haoda Todd's work. This exposure led to attention in Europe, including at London Pacific Fashion Week in 2017 and 2018. 

The first time she traveled to London, she was the only designer representing PNG; in 2018 she took Anna Amos of AA Tribal and also Alang Isaac, a model from her Angau Angles organization. However, it was challenging to raise the funds for them to travel and ship exhibits to London.

Selected runway shows include:
 Runway 2014, 2016
 PNG Fashion and Design Week
 London Pacific Fashion Week
 Fiji Fashion Week 2013, 2014
 Pacific Resort Wear show in Fiji
 Port Moresby Fashion Week 2016
 Thirteen designers from across the Pacific, including Fiji, Cook Islands, and Papua New Guinea showcased their 2013 collections for the first time in Papua New Guinea at the new Cosmopolitan Club in Port Moresby on Wednesday 27 November.

By 2015, Haoda Todd was managing business interests in PNG, Australia, Fiji and a number of Asian countries. 

Fashion retailer Jack's of PNG commissioned PNGianKala for an exclusive line of clothing in 2016.

In 2017, Haoda Todd lead an effort to launch PNGiankala Runway, a platform PNG designers can join to help raise funds to travel abroad. That same year, her newest line, honoring Susan Karike Huhume, premiered at the Pacific Resort Wear show, her third runway show in Fiji.

Indigenous Business Council 
Arguing that only ten percent of the formal business sector in PNG is owned by indigenous individuals, Haoda Todd was one of a group of business people who felt the need for an organization to be a voice for aspiring indigenous entrepreneurs. 

In 2011, at the Indigenous Business Summit and Trade Expo in Kokopo, participants representing over 750 indigenous-owned businesses identified this need. 

On 14 December 2012, their dream was realized with the formal launch of the Indigenous Business Council, followed by an agreement from the government to grant $500 million in support of recruiting and developing indigenous-owned businesses. Haoda Todd was Secretary from 2011 to 2013. Citing constraints on accessing credit, accessing raw materials, no consistent access to basic services due to poor infrastructure such as roads, lack of electricity, lack of knowledge in technology, and human resources and cultural beliefs, the council offers planning assistance, paperwork assistance, and training in other areas that Haoda Todd remembers learning by trial and error. Overall, it aims to protect indigenous business owners and their businesses. As the organization had no funding, she organized a series of fundraiser to keep the Council operating.

Haoda Todd believes there exists the local talent and workforce to build a fashion industry in PNG, and hopes local people will take it seriously as a basis for careers and successful enterprises.

Women Arise PNG 
Haoda Todd entered a new field of civic engagement in November 2011, when Lae experienced widespread riots in which dozens of people were killed or injured. While media reported a variety of causes, from ethnic tensions to rising crime rates, at least some of the anger was sparked by sexual assaults on two young women. Haoda Todd was angry that the task force put together to analyze ethnic tensions and work towards solutions was entirely male, and called on the local government to appoint women to work on the investigation and repair.

After a series of attacks on women in 2013, Haoda Todd and Esther Igo formed a group called "Women Arise PNG," and went to Parliament House in Port Moresby to meet with the national Minister for Community Development, Loujaya Toni, to argue for prioritizing action to end violence. Haoda Todd continued with local action with Women Arise, including: the "Walk Against Violence" rally held in Lae on Sunday 21 February 2016; fundraising for events raising awareness about violence against women; partnerships with other interested organizations, such as Femili PNG; the #JusticeforMoanna campaign, responding to the shooting of an innocent young woman; leadership in calling for the Government, students, police, and the University of PNG administration to work together to find a way out of violence that led to the shooting of University of PNG students in 2016; and helping gather supplies for families affected by an earthquake in the area in 2018.

Civic activity 
Haoda Todd has maintained an active and engaged civic life. She focuses on opportunities for business development and women's rights.

Building on her commitment to businesses and the challenges brought on by corruption, Haoda Todd was treasurer and on the Board of Directors for Transparency International PNG, in 2013–2014.

She helped organize the Sir Anthony Siaguru Walk Against Corruption in 2013.

In addition, Haoda Todd has been a committee member of the PNG Red Cross, Lae Branch, director on the Board of Habitat for Humanity, Papua New Guinea, director on TISOL Board (The International School of Lae). In 2019, Haoda Todd was one of nine local leaders the provincial and national governments tapped to lead the newly founded Morobe Health Authority (MPHA). Bringing together influential community members with local religious, civic, and business organizations to offer oversight of local health services, the government hoped, would make them more effective and efficient.

Hospital governance 
Haoda Todd is a board member of the Angau Memorial General Hospital in Lae City. She believes that PNG's success is directly tied to the health of its citizens, and promoted programs through which the hospital helped assure individuals in rural regions access to healthcare.

Angau Angels 
Haoda Todd has helped the Angau Angels organize fashion shows to raise money for the Angau Memorial General Hospital. When the 6th PNG Games were held in Lae, she directed the Angau Angels Fashion Extravaganza, which featured work from a range of PNG fashion designers, modeled by seventy young people who were born at the hospital or had otherwise benefited from its services.

One of her Angau Angels models is Alang Isaac, who has worked runways for PNGianKala in various countries, as well as singing for the domestically popular band, Jokema.

Beauty pageants 
Herself a former Miss Papua New Guinea, Haoda Todd was a judge in the Miss South Pacific beauty pageant in 2014.

She was a judge for the Digicel PNG Foundation's 2016 Men of Honor Awards, Community Leadership category.

Personal life 
Originally from Poreporena, Port Moresby, she married her husband, entrepreneur Gordon Todd, on 23 July 2005. They live in Lae, They have five children.

Awards 

 2019 Awarded "FOUNDER AWARD" by the Kumul Gamechangers of Papua New Guinea
 2013 "FEMALE DIRECTOR OF THE YEAR" by PNG Institute of Directors
 2011 Awarded "Entrepreneur of the Year" Award by Westpac Business Women Awards
 2011 Winner of Overall "Westpac Outstanding Woman", Business Woman of the Year
 2011 Nominated for SP Brewery Entrepreneur Award
 2012 Nominated to tour US cities, US State Department International Visitor Leadership Program (IVLP)
 2003 Represented Papua New Guinea in Golf at the South Pacific Games in Fiji
 1998, Represented Lae Squash Team at the National Championships in Madang
 1992, Represented Papua New Guinea as a Pavilion Ambassador at the World Exposition in Seville, Spain
 1989, Crowned 2nd Runner-up in the Red Cross Miss Papua New Guinea pageant

References

External links 
 London Pacific Fashion Week Gallery

Papua New Guinean artists
Fashion designers
Women fashion designers
Papua New Guinean women activists
Asian women in business
Women business executives
Living people
Year of birth missing (living people)
Papua New Guinean businesspeople